"Looking Good Feeling Gorgeous" is the first single from RuPaul's album Red Hot. The dance/house song is a self-affirming anthem of self-confidence, particularly in relation to one's appearance. It was released exclusively on a CD single on RuCo, Inc., RuPaul's own label.

Lyrics
The section during which RuPaul speaks contains numerous references to the documentary film Paris is Burning. Including a direct quote from one of the films main characters, Venus Xtravaganza: "Touch this skin, darling, touch this skin honey, touch all of this skin! You just can't take it! You're just an overgrown orangutan!"

Music video
The single's music video featured drag performer Shirley Q. Liquor getting cosmetic surgery and transforming from an overweight woman eating fried chicken into RuPaul. The video featured male fitness model Rusty Joiner as RuPaul's scantily-clad surgeon.

The music video was directed by fashion photographer Mike Ruiz, and produced for CAYA FILMWORKS by Jeff Beasley. The video is also a social criticism of the standards of beauty in our society.

Chart performance
It debuted on Billboard's Hot Dance Club Play chart as the No. 1 breakout track peaking at number 2. It went to 56 on US Singles Chart and number 3 on Australia's Aria Charts.

Year-end charts

Track listings

 Shirley Q. Liquor & Watusi Jenkins (Album Version)
 High Heel Steppin' Radio – D1 Music Radio
 Looking Good, Feeling Gorgeous (Gomi Radio)
 High Heel Steppin' Mixshow – D1 Music Mixshow
 Looking Good, Feeling Gorgeous (Gomi Mixshow)
 High Heel Steppin' Dub – D1 Music Dub
 Looking Good, Feeling Gorgeous (Gomi Dub)
 Looking Good, Feeling Gorgeous (Album Version Clean)

References

2004 singles
RuPaul songs
2004 songs